Haripriya Banoth (née Badavath; born 1 May 1985) is an Indian politician serving as an MLA representing the Yellandu constituency in the Telangana Legislative Assembly since 2018. She was elected from the Indian National Congress but later joined the Telangana Rashtra Samithi in 2019. At the age of 33 when elected, Banoth is the youngest member of the Telangana Legislative Assembly.

Early and personal life 
Haripriya Badavath was born on 1 May 1985 in Kothagudem of present-day Telangana (then in Andhra Pradesh) to Seetharam and Darjan. Her father used to work in the Singareni Collieries Company. She was married to Hari Singh Banoth of Tekulapalli immediately after completing her intermediate education in 2002. However, with her husband's encouragement, she completed her graduation with B. Tech and later obtained post-graduation with M. Tech in computer science from the Jawaharlal Nehru Technological University, Hyderabad (JNTUH). In 2006, they started Hari Singh Education Institutions which has four private schools and four junior colleges in Tekulapalli and Hyderabad. She lives at Tekulapalli, Telangana.

In June 2021, Banoth announced that she would adopt two orphaned children from Yellandu who lost both their parents at a young age, on a response to the minister K. T. Rama Rao tweet.

Career 
Hari Singh was an active member of the Telugu Desam Party (TDP) which influenced Haripriya to join the politics. For the 2014 Andhra Pradesh Legislative Assembly election, the TDP chief N. Chandrababu Naidu nominated Haripriya Banoth to represent the Yellandu constituency from TDP as the party felt that an educated person would have a better chance at winning the seat. However, she was defeated by the Indian National Congress (INC) candidate Kanakaiah Koram by a margin of 11,507 votes.

In 2017, following the statehood of Telangana, Banoth joined Indian National Congress in the hope of contesting from the party. In the 2018 Telangana Legislative Assembly election, Banoth was elected as a Member of the Legislative Assembly (MLA) from Yellandu by narrowly defeating the incumbent Kanakaiah Koram of the Telangana Rashtra Samithi (TRS) with a margin of 2,887 votes. Elected at the age of 33, Banoth became the youngest MLA in the Telangana Legislative Assembly.

In February 2019, Banoth carried out a hunger strike for 36 hours demanding the establishment of steel plant in Bayyaram. In March 2019, she joined the Telangana Rashtra Samithi citing "the interest of her constituency's development" as the reason.

Political statistics

References 

Living people
1985 births
Telangana politicians
Telangana Rashtra Samithi politicians
Telugu Desam Party politicians
Indian National Congress politicians from Telangana
Women in Telangana politics
Telangana MLAs 2018–2023
Women members of the Telangana Legislative Assembly
20th-century Indian women politicians
People from Bhadradri Kothagudem district
21st-century Indian women politicians